The Real Don is the third album by French musician Lord Kossity, released in 2001 on the label Naïve Records.

Track listing

Chart

References

2001 albums
Lord Kossity albums